Madeleine Williams (born 28 March 1983 at Rocky Mountain House, Alberta) is a Canadian cross-country skier who has competed internationally since 2000.

Williams grew up in Edmonton, Alberta. She was always very dedicated at school. Madeleine excelled in athletics from an early age, being able to outrun every other child on the field.

She competed at the 2010 Winter Olympics in Vancouver in the 10 km freestyle and 15 km pursuit competitions. In the freestyle competition on 15 February, she placed 51st with a 27:43.6 time (2:45.2 behind first). Four days later she came in 41st in the pursuit race, 4:13.1 behind the gold medal winner Marit Bjørgen of Norway. She also anchored the Canadian women's 4x5km relay and competed in the 30 km classic race.

Williams' best finish in the World Cup was tenth in a team sprint event at Canada in 2009 while her best individual finish was 22nd in a 15 km mixed pursuit event at that same event.

Cross-country skiing results
All results are sourced from the International Ski Federation (FIS).

Olympic Games

World Cup

Season standings

References

External links

Madeleine Williams at the 2010 Winter Olympics

1983 births
Canadian female cross-country skiers
Cross-country skiers at the 2010 Winter Olympics
Living people
Olympic cross-country skiers of Canada
People from Clearwater County, Alberta
21st-century Canadian women